Bribria is a genus of flowering plants belonging to the family Violaceae.

Its native range is Central and Southern Tropical America.

Species:

Bribria apiculata 
Bribria crenata 
Bribria oraria

References

Violaceae
Malpighiales genera